Simple Gospel is the second  live album from United Pursuit. The group released the album on August 14, 2015. They worked with Garrett Sale, in the production of this album.

Critical reception

Awarding the album five stars from Worship Leader, Jay Akins states, "With Simple Gospel, United Pursuit invites us to worship with their family and the larger family of God." Timothy Monger, reviewing the album at AllMusic, writes, "United Pursuit Band offer a passionate, folk-inspired take on modern worship music." Giving the album a seven out of ten for Cross Rhythms, says, "'Simple Gospel' is aptly named - it successfully invites you strip away all the distractions and complications in life and focus on the simple, wonderful truth of Jesus' love."

Awards and accolades
The album was ranked No. 13 on Worship Leader Top 20 Albums of 2015 list.

Track listing

Chart performance

References

2015 live albums